The North Dakota Fighting Hawks softball team is a part of the athletic program at the University of North Dakota in Grand Forks, North Dakota. They are members of the NCAA Division I Summit League. The program only includes a women's team. The current Fighting Hawks softball head coach is Jordan Stevens.

Head coaches

Arenas
Apollo Park 2007–present

Championships
2010 Great West Conference Tournament.

See also
List of NCAA Division I softball programs

References

External links
Fighting Sioux Softball website